Bitervan (also Romanized as Bītervān) is a village in Pirsalman Rural District, in the Central District of Asadabad County, Hamadan Province, Iran. At the 2006 census, its population was 537, in 130 families.

References 

Populated places in Asadabad County